Save Your Soul may refer to:
 "Save Your Soul", a song by She Wants Revenge from the EP Save Your Soul
 "Save Your Soul", a song by Celine Dion from the album Loved Me Back to Life
 "Save Your Soul",  a song by Jamie Cullum from the album Momentum